is a 1998 farm simulation game developed by MuuMuu and System Sacom. It was released in Japan only.

Gameplay 

Astronōka is described as a "space vegetable production and pest control game". The game revolves around the player cultivating vegetables on a fictional, futuristic star system. The objective is to win vegetable contests and eventually the All-Universe Vegetable Competition, while setting traps and defense to protect the farm against a species of pest called .

Release 
It was published by Enix for the PlayStation console on August 27, 1998, and by Square Enix on the PlayStation Network on June 25, 2008.

Very first original Japanese release of the PSOne game Star Ocean Second Story was bundled exclusively with a third disc (the only version of that game ever officially released which had three discs instead of two) which had a playable demo of Astronoka on it.

The Astronōka Original Soundtrack was published by Media Ring on September 2, 1998. It bears the catalog number MGCD-1063.

An anime series titled  was produced by Enix and broadcast on TV Asahi from 2001 to 2002 as part of the cooking program Wagamanma Kitchen. Each episode lasts one minute. Merchandise such as stickers, badges, mobile straps and mobile phone content based on Baboo were also produced.

Cosmogurashi: Online Teki Yasai Seikatsu, a massively multiplayer online game based in the Astronōka universe, was developed by MuuMuu, MicroVision and Community Engine and published by Enix on March 28, 2003. Its service was terminated on April 25, 2005.

Reception 
Famitsu magazine gave it a 34 out of 40 score.

References

External links 
Official page on the Enix website (archive) 
Official page (PSN version) on the Square Enix website 
Official page (PSN version) on the PlayStation website 

1998 video games
Japan-exclusive video games
Enix games
PlayStation (console) games
PlayStation (console)-only games
Simulation video games
Square Enix games
Video games developed in Japan
Single-player video games